Gastoniella is a genus of ferns belonging to the family Pteridaceae.

Its native range is Ascension, South America and North America.

Species:

Gastoniella ascensionis 
Gastoniella chaerophylla 
Gastoniella novogaliciana

References

Pteridaceae
Fern genera